Ibrahim Samed (born 1 July 1992) is a Ghanaian professional footballer who plays as a defender for Ghanaian Premier League side Ashanti Gold.

Career

New Edubiase United 
Samed previously plied his trade with New Edubiase-based club New Edubiase United F.C. before joining Ashanti Gold. He served as captain for the club and made 21 league appearances in the 2016 Ghanaian Premier League season as New Edubiase United were unfortunately relegated.

Ashanti Gold 
Being one of the standout performers for the club he was signed by Obuasi-based side Ashanti Gold. In 2019 after his contract with the club expired he refused to sign a new contract and signed for rivals Asante Kotoko but the deal fell through. He later returned to AshGold and signed a new contract. He was a member of the club's squad that featured in the 2020–21 CAF Confederation Cup.

References

External links 

 
 
 Image of Ibrahim Samed on ESPN

Living people
1992 births
Association football defenders
Ghanaian footballers
New Edubiase United F.C. players
Ashanti Gold SC players